Platydoris cruenta is a species of sea slug, a dorid nudibranch, shell-less marine opisthobranch gastropod mollusks in the family Discodorididae.

Distribution
This species was described from New Guinea. It is widespread in the Indo-Pacific Ocean.

References

 Bergh, L. S. R. (1877). Malacologische Untersuchungen. In: Semper C, ed. Reisen im Archipel der Philippinen. theil 2, heft 10. Wiesbaden: Kreidel, 495–546, plates 58–6.

External links 
 

Discodorididae
Gastropods described in 1832